Adam of Saint Victor (died 1146) was a prolific poet and composer of Latin hymns and sequences. He has been called "...the most illustrious exponent of the revival of liturgical poetry which the twelfth century affords."

Life
Adam of Saint Victor was born in the early part of the twelfth century, probably at Paris, where he was educated. The first reference to him dates from 1098, in the archives of Notre Dame Cathedral, where he held office first as a subdeacon and later as a precentor. He left the cathedral for the Abbey of Saint Victor around 1133, probably because of his attempts at imposing the Rule of St Augustine at the cathedral.

Adam likely had contact with a number of important theologians, poets, and musicians of his day, including Peter Abelard and Hugh of St Victor, and he may have taught Albertus Parisiensis.

He lived in the abbey, which was somewhat of a theological center, then in the suburbs of Paris but included in it subsequently through the city's growth. He died there some time between 1172 and 1192.

Appreciation
According to John Julian, "His principal merits may be described as comprising terseness and felicity of expression; deep and accurate knowledge of Scripture, especially its typology; smoothness of versification; richness of rhyme, accumulating gradually as he nears the conclusion of a Sequence; and a spirit of devotion breathing throughout his work, that assures the reader that his work is "a labour of love."

Anglican Archbishop Richard Chenevix Trench characterized Adam of Saint Victor as "the foremost among the sacred Latin poets of the Middle Ages". 

In Mont Saint Michel and Chartres, Henry Adams wrote that Adam "aimed at obtaining his effect from the skillful use of the Latin sonorities for purposes of the chant."

The translator of medieval hymns, John Mason Neale, described Adam of St Victor as "to my mind the greatest Latin poet, not only of mediaeval, but of all ages".

Works
Adam of St Victor's surviving works are sequences for liturgical use, not theological treatises.

Jodocus Clichtovaeus, a Catholic theologian of the 16th century, published thirty-seven of his hymns in the Elucidatorium Ecclesiasticum (1516). The remaining seventy hymns were preserved in the Abbey of Saint Victor until its dissolution during the French Revolution. They were then transferred to the Bibliothèque Nationale, where they were discovered by Léon Gautier, who edited the first complete edition of them (Paris, 1858).

Around 47 sequences by Adam survive. In a practice that developed from the ninth century onwards, these are poems composed to be sung during the mass, between the Alleluia and the gospel reading. The sequence therefore bridges the Old Testament or epistle readings and the gospel, both literarily and musically.

References

Further reading

The modern critical edition of the Latin text is:

English translations of Adam's work are in:

 [includes translations of two of Adam of St. Victor's sequences in praise of the Trinity]
 [includes translation of Adam of St Victor, Sequences] 
 Vol. 1, Vol. 2, Vol. 3

Studies:

External links
 

Hymnographers
11th-century births
1146 deaths
Medieval Latin poets
Year of birth unknown
French classical composers
French male classical composers
12th-century French composers
Medieval male composers
12th-century Latin writers
12th-century French writers
12th-century French poets
Latin-language writers from France